The Nikon D5600 is a 24.2 megapixel upper-entry level, APS-C sensor DSLR announced by Nikon on November 10, 2016, as the successor of the D5500.  The camera has an F-mount.

D5600 offers only small changes over the predecessor, among them is Bluetooth connection. With SnapBridge application on smart device, the camera can be remote controlled. SnapBridge also allows automated updating of camera's clock and GPS.

Features
 24MP CMOS sensor with no optical low-pass filter (OLPF), Nikon DX format; focal length equivalent to approx. 1.5x that of lenses with FX-format angle of view.
 Nikon EXPEED 4 image/video processor.
 3.2″ Fully Articulated touchscreen LCD with 1.04M dots 
 Full HD 1080p / 60fps movie mode with auto-focus while filming, mono sound, and stereo external mic support. 
 ISO sensitivity 100 - 25600 
 Active D-Lighting (four levels)
 Eye-level pentamirror single-lens reflex viewfinder
 5.0 fps continuous shooting
 SD (Secure Digital) and UHS-I compliant SDHC and SDXC memory cards
 Autofocus is available with AF-S, AF-P and AF-I lenses
 Inbuilt time-lapse movie feature
 39 point AF sensor with 9 central cross-type points
 2,016-pixel RGB sensor assists AF tracking and metering
 'SnapBridge' Bluetooth/Wi-Fi communication
 Exposure compensation can be adjusted by -5 to +5 EV in increments of 1/3 or 1/2 EV in P, S, A, M, SCENE and night vision modes
 Luminosity locked at detected value with AE-L/AF-L button
 Focus can be locked by pressing shutter-release button halfway (single-servo AF) or by pressing AE-L/AF-L button
 Built-in or external stereo microphone; sensitivity adjustable

With the camera's initial firmware version Wi-Fi only works with Nikon's proprietary "SnapBridge" app, this also applies to other Nikon models. Since a firmware updated in May 2019 Wi-Fi was opened to third party applications.

Predecessor comparison 
The Nikon D5600 is the successor to the Nikon D5500 (announced in January 2015). Both cameras are very similar except for the following differences
 The Nikon D5600's body is heavier than the D5500. (465g vs 420g)
 The Nikon D5600 has more connectivity options (NFC and Bluetooth), while the D5500 features only Wi-Fi.
 The Nikon D5600 has more battery life (970 shots vs 820 shots).

Reception
Since its release, the D5600 has received positive reviews. It received the Best DSLR Entry Level award at the TIPA Awards 2017, sponsored by the Technical Image Press Association.

See also
 List of Nikon F-mount lenses with integrated autofocus motor

References

External links

 
 Google Image: Nikon D5600 sample, review and user images, >20MPix

D5600
D5600
Live-preview digital cameras
Cameras introduced in 2016